United Nations Security Council Resolution 1815 was unanimously adopted on 2 June 2008.

Resolution 
The Security Council today extended the mandate of the International Independent Investigation Commission, which is investigating the 2005 murder of Lebanon’s former Prime Minister, Rafiq Hariri, and other attacks, until 31 December 2008.

Unanimously adopting resolution 1815 (2008), the Council left open the possibility of terminating the mandate earlier, if the Commission reported that it had completed implementation of that mandate.

The International Independent Investigation Commission was established on 7 April 2005 by resolution 1595 (see Press Release SC/8353), with the Lebanese Government’s approval, in order to investigate in all its aspects the terrorist attack that killed Mr. Hariri and others and caused the injury of numerous people, including helping to identify its perpetrators, sponsors, organizers and accomplices.

See also 
List of United Nations Security Council Resolutions 1801 to 1900 (2008–2009)

References

External links
 
Text of the Resolution at undocs.org

 1815
June 2008 events
History of the Middle East